"Demons & Angels" is the fifth episode of science fiction sit-com Red Dwarf Series V and the twenty ninth in the series run. It was first broadcast on the British television channel BBC2 on 19 March 1992. Written by Rob Grant and Doug Naylor, the episode was the first to be filmed with new director Juliet May. The episode has the regular Red Dwarf crew meeting angelic and demonic versions of themselves.

Plot
Kryten creates a device derived from the Matter Paddle called the Triplicator, hoping it will solve any future supply problems that might arise on Red Dwarf. Testing it on a strawberry, Dave Lister opts to test the two copies it makes, finding that one is divinely succulent while the other is filled with maggots. Kryten deduces that the device creates copies that appear identical but are different – one retains the best elements while the other retains the worst. When Lister opts to test the device in reversal mode, he inadvertently destroys the ship's science lab, damages Holly's voice unit and sets the ship's engine core into meltdown. As a result, he, Kryten, Arnold Rimmer and the Cat are forced to escape in a Starbug moments before Red Dwarf explodes. When they discover they are low on essential supplies including oxygen for Lister and Cat and battery power for Rimmer, the group's attempt to scan for more leads them to discovering that there are two identical copies of Red Dwarf. Kryten realises that the triplicator created them when put into reverse, destroying the original in the process.

Discovering they must rebuild the triplicator to restore the original Red Dwarf, the group are forced to find the components for it on both copies before they both cease to exist. While they discover one of these is an idyllic version of Red Dwarf, with virtuous copies of themselves that embody the best of their personalities, the second copy is a demonic version of Red Dwarf, with versions of themselves that embody the worst of their personalities. Their demonic counterparts opt to fight them in order to take control of a new ship as their own is decaying, destroying their angelic counterparts, while capturing Lister and implanting a remote control device to make him kill the others. However, Lister manages to warn the others, allowing Kryten to subdue their demonic counterparts, rebuild the triplicator, and reverse its effects on Red Dwarf. However, Lister accidentally re-implants the control device he had had removed from his body. Cat uses it to punish him for putting the group through considerable danger.

Production
"Demons & Angels", which had the working title "High & Low", was the first episode from Series V to be filmed. Following the departure of Ed Bye, who had directed all the previous four series' episodes, Juliet May was brought in as the new director.

Grant and Naylor commented that the script was a tricky episode to shoot. Several scenes had to be re-shot and going back to re-shoot caused no end of stress as they re-wrote and directed the episode with limited studio time. Scenes were re-written there and then and given to the cast to block out in one take.

For this series the Red Dwarf model was rebuilt from the original version which had fallen apart over the years. The ship explosion was filmed using pyrotechnics and shooting the cameras at three thousand frames a second. From a few seconds of explosions the crew got around 20 seconds' worth of film footage.

To achieve the High and Low versions interacting with the regular Red Dwarf crew, traditional split screen techniques were used with a locked-off camera. Doubles were employed for other scenes.  Craig Charles performed bluescreen scenes to roll on the floor in front of himself; the video effects crew added a holowhip.

At one point, the Doctor's TARDIS from Doctor Who can be seen parked in the Red Dwarf's landing bay. The shot was originally filmed for "Marooned", but was cut from that episode.

Reception
The episode was originally broadcast on the British television channel BBC2 on 19 March 1992 in the 9:00pm evening time slot, and received a mixed response from viewers.

Fans have pointed to a noticeable continuity error in the episode when Lister refers to events from the series 4 episode White Hole, even though he should have no memory of them.

References

External links

Series V episode guide at www.reddwarf.co.uk

Red Dwarf V episodes
1992 British television episodes